A Shark oil pattern is a pattern of oil on the lane used by the Professional Bowlers Association in tournament play.

A typical Shark pattern is 44 feet long. It forces players to move toward the center of the lanes, because if the ball moves to the outside it will not curve back into the pocket. This play is more risky, because it puts the gutters in play. The forcing of players to take inside angles makes playing these lanes tougher and lower scoring for professionals.

This oil pattern is named after the shark because, like a shark, which lives primarily in the depths of the ocean, the bowler is forced to play deep in the middle of the lane.

Tournaments that used this pattern

References

External links 
PBA Oil Patterns

Ten-pin bowling